Mido may refer to:

 Mido (watch), a traditional Swiss watch brand owned by the Swatch Group
 Mido, one of the nicknames for males named Muhammad or Ahmad in the Arab World
 Midō, a Japanese family name
 Manufacturing Inspection District Offices, a body of the FAA

People 

 Mido (footballer), an Egyptian football player.
 Mido Hamada, a German-Egyptian actor.
 Jeon Mi-do, a South Korean actress

Fictional characters 

 Ban Mido from GetBackers.
 Shingo Mido from Death Note.
 Madoka Mido from Starship Girl Yamamoto Yohko.
 Miko Mido from La Blue Girl.
 Kusabi Mido from Rosario + Vampire.
 Mido, a fictional character from the video game The Legend of Zelda: Ocarina of Time